Greiveldange is a small town in the commune of Stadtbredimus, in south-eastern Luxembourg. , the town has a population of 951.

Remich (canton)
Towns in Luxembourg